Joseph Stevens Jones (born September 28, 1809 in Boston, Massachusetts – died December 29, 1877 in Boston, Massachusetts) was an American actor, playwright, theater manager and surgeon. He is the son of Captain Abraham A. Jones and Mary Ann Stevens.

Dr. Jones' father, a sea captain who had been in the employ of the Russian American Company (Alaska), died in 1819 in Unalaska, leaving Dr. Jones and his four siblings to be raised by his mother back in Boston. Dr. Jones debuted as an actor at the age of 18 in a production of "The Turnpike Gate" in Providence Rhode Island. He was at different times proprietor and manager of the Old National, Tremont, and other theatres in Boston. In 1843 he graduated from Harvard Medical School, and held the place of city physician for several years during the administrations of Mayor Wightman and Mayor Lincoln.  Dr. Jones was a member of Mechanic Light Infantry, and was connected for many years with the old First Regiment as surgeon.

Dr. Jones married Hannah Canterbury Dexter (1812–1870). They had four children.  He married second his first wife's sister, Louisa Goward Dexter (1814–1890). Nathaniel Dexter Jones, (1838–1912), his son, was also an actor and theater manager. He was a member of the Howard Athenaeum Stock Company for many years and was connected with the stage for 52 years.

Jones was a prolific author, writing about 200 plays. The most popular among them were:

Captain Kyd; or, The Wizard of the Sea (National Theatre, Boston, 1830)
Eugene Aram
The Liberty Tree; or, Boston Boys in '76 (Warren Theatre, Boston, 1832). This was Jones's first successful play. It celebrated the fiftieth anniversary of the end of the Revolutionary War. Jones played the Yankee character Bill Ball.
The Green Mountain Boy (Park Theatre, New York, March 19, 1833). Provided actor George Handel Hill one of his most famous roles, as Jedediah Homebred, a Yankee servant with an inexhaustible supply of homespun sayings.
The Fire Warrior
The Siege of Boston
The Surgeon of Paris; or, The Mask of the Huguenots (National Theatre Boston, January 8, 1838). Sequel to The Carpenter of Rouen.
Moll Pitcher; or, The Fortune Teller of Lynn (National Theatre, Boston, 1839). Based on the life of Moll Pitcher, a famous New England fortune-teller.
Solon Shingle; or, The People's Lawyer (National Theatre, Boston, 1839). Jones's best-known play tells the story of the trial of Charles Otis, a poor clerk framed by a coworker for stealing. The play's popularity rests on the character of Solon Shingle, played by John E. Owens. Owens was a great success in the role, making his final performance as Shingle in New York in 1884.
Stephen Burroughs
The Carpenter of Rouen; or, A Revenge for the Massacre of St. Bartholomew (Chatham Theatre, New York, November 16, 1840). "A mechanic, sir, is one of God's noblemen.... The Supreme Ruler of the universe is himself the Great Mechanic."
Job and Jacob Gray
The Last Dollar
The Sons of the Cape
Zofara
Captain Lascar
Paul Revere and the Sons of Liberty written in 1875.
The Silver Spoon; or, Our Own Folks (Boston Museum, February 16, 1852). William Warren the younger, of the Boston Museum, made a great success as Jefferson Scattering Batkins. The play concerns a humorous country delegate to the Massachusetts General Court who is tricked by the other characters. It was revived at that theater through many seasons and reprinted in 1911.
The Three Experiments of Living, a dramatization of the novel by Mrs. Hannah F. Lee.

Dr. Jones also published a novel in 1871, "Life of Jefferson S. Batkins, Member from Cranberry Centre, Written by Himself, Assisted by the Author of The Silver Spoon".

Jones supported copyright protection and adequate compensation for authors. Source:  In this letter, Dr. Jones points to the weakness of the copyright laws, that several of his plays have been performed throughout the States without remuneration to himself.  He also notes that his plays were meant to be performed, not read.

References

Sources
Boston Daily Advertiser obituary December 31, 1877;
Boston Sunday Globe article on the Author of "The Silver Spoon"  March 26, 1916;
Dictionary of American Biography, Vol V, Scribners;
Boston Evening Transcript article on "Actor, Manager, Playwright and Physician" by John Bouve Clapp December 30, 1910;
Boston Daily Globe obituary Dec 30 1877; and
Boston Post obituary Dec 30 1877;
"Memoirs of an Old Actor" by W.M. Leman;
"A History of the American Drama from the Beginning to the Civil War" by A. H.Quinn

External links

Selected list of works
The Cambridge Paperback Guide to Theatre
Selected list of works from The Cambridge History of American Literature
Nathaniel Dexter Jones

1877 deaths
19th-century American dramatists and playwrights
Harvard Medical School alumni
19th century in Boston
1809 births